Ralph B. Wright (January 16, 1908 – August 3, 1976) was an American football player. He played college football at Kentucky and professionally in the National Football League (NFL) as a tackle for the Brooklyn Dodgers. He appeared in six NFL games during the 1933 season.

References

1908 births
1976 deaths
American football tackles
Brooklyn Dodgers (NFL) players
Kentucky Wildcats football players
People from Union County, Kentucky
Players of American football from Kentucky